The 2022–23 Biathlon World Cup – Stage 3 was the third event of the season and was held in Annecy-Le Grand-Bornand, France, from 15 to 18 December 2022.

Schedule of events 
The events took place at the following times.

Medal winners

Men

Women

References 

Biathlon World Cup - Stage 3, 2022-23
2022–23 Biathlon World Cup
Biathlon World Cup - Stage 3
Biathlon competitions in France